American singer and rapper Doja Cat has released three studio albums, one extended play (EP), 36 singles (including 15 as a featured artist), 27 music videos, and five promotional singles. According to Recording Industry Association of America, Doja Cat has sold 34 million certified albums and singles in the United States as a lead artist.

Following several SoundCloud uploads as a teenager from 2012, Doja Cat self-released her debut single, "So High", in 2014 before releasing her debut EP, Purrr!, later that year. Her debut studio album, Amala, was released on March 30, 2018, before her existing catalog began gaining attention following the viral success of the song "Mooo!" in August 2018. Soon after "Mooo!", "Candy", "Tia Tamera", and "Juicy" gained significant attention on the video-sharing platform TikTok, which led to the release of the Amala deluxe edition on March 1, 2019. Capitalizing on her growing popularity, her second studio album, Hot Pink, was released in the same year on November 7, 2019, and ultimately charted in the top 20 of countries such as United States, Australia, Canada, Norway, Sweden, Netherlands and New Zealand, earning gold certifications in the United States and Denmark, as well as a platinum certification in New Zealand.

Hot Pink spawned the breakthrough single, "Say So", which became her first top 10 single on the Billboard Hot 100. Supported by two remixes featuring Nicki Minaj, it became Doja Cat's first No. 1 in the US. It has been certified multi-platinum in countries such as the United States, Australia, Canada, United Kingdom, and New Zealand. In early 2021, "Streets" was released as the seventh single from Hot Pink after it became a sleeper hit due to a TikTok challenge known as the #SilhouetteChallenge which includes a snippet of Paul Anka's 1959 hit song "Put Your Head on My Shoulder". Her third studio album, Planet Her, was released on June 25, 2021, and spawned the top-10 singles "Kiss Me More" featuring SZA, "Need to Know", and "Woman".

Studio albums

Extended plays

Singles

As lead artist

As featured artist

Promotional singles

Other charted and certified songs

Guest appearances

Music videos

Notes

References

External links
 
 
 
 

Discographies of American artists
Discography